The kozobas is a bowed and percussive instrument that is popular in folk ensembles in Western Ukraine. It is a recently developed instrument and is basically a wooden pole joined to a drum at one end with a cymbal hanging from the other end. The drum membrane acts as the soundboard for one or two strings strung from the end of the pole to the end of the drum. The strings are played with a bow that occasionally hits the cymbal hanging from the other end of the pole. Recent developments include instruments with four strings tuned like those of a double bass.

The instrument's Hornbostel-Sachs classification number is 321.322-71+111.2.

See also
Ukrainian folk music

Sources

Humeniuk, A. - Ukrainski narodni muzychni instrumenty - Kyiv: Naukova dumka, 1967
Mizynec, V. - Ukrainian Folk Instruments - Melbourne: Bayda books, 1984
Cherkaskyi, L. - Ukrainski narodni muzychni instrumenty // Tekhnika, Kyiv, Ukraine, 2003 - 262 pages. 

Ukrainian musical instruments
String instruments